The 2000 Brabantse Pijl was the 40th edition of the Brabantse Pijl cycle race and was held on 26 March 2000. The race started in Zaventem and finished in Alsemberg. The race was won by Johan Museeuw.

General classification

References

2000
Brabantse Pijl